Palmitas is a village in the Soriano Department of western Uruguay.

Geography
The railroad track Montevideo - Mercedes pass through this town.

History
Its status was elevated to "Pueblo" (village) on 6 November 1953 by the Act of Ley Nº 12.021. Previously it had been the head of the judicial section "Coquimbo".

Population
In 2011 Palmitas had a population of 2,123.
 
Source: Instituto Nacional de Estadística de Uruguay

Places of worship
 Immaculate Conception Parish Church (Roman Catholic)

References

External links
INE map of Palmitas

Populated places in the Soriano Department